M-Cubed is a miniaturized satellite built by students at the University of Michigan in a joint project run by the Michigan Exploration Laboratory (MXL) and JPL. It is an example of the popular CubeSat design for amateur satellites. It was launched from Vandenberg Air Force Base on October 28, 2011 atop a Delta II rocket. M-Cubed was launched as a secondary payload to the Suomi NPP satellite, along with AubieSat-1, DICE-1, DICE-2, Explorer-1 Prime, and RAX-2.

M-Cubed, short for Michigan Multipurpose Minisat, was designed as a technology demonstrator for a new FPGA-based image processing system intended for a future NASA mission, Aerosol-Cloud-Ecosystem, recommended by the Earth Science Decadal Survey. The mission was also intended to validate the satellite bus design for use in future cubesat missions. The satellite uses a passive magnetorquer for attitude control, consisting of a large permanent magnet that aligns the satellite with the Earth's magnetic field. On-board control is provided by a Taskit Stamp9G20 microcontroller running Real time Linux.

Following launch, MXL was unable to command M-Cubed, and observed anomalies in its transmitted data. MXL concluded that the M-Cubed CubeSat became magnetically conjoined to Explorer-1 [Prime], a second CubeSat released at the same time, via both satellites' attitude control magnets. This is the first recorded instance of two satellites unintentionally and non-destructively latching together. As a result of this incident, M-Cubed was unable to complete its mission.

The M-Cubed mission was successfully re-flown as MCubed-2, launched on December 6, 2013.

See also

 Explorer-1 [Prime]

References

External links
 
 AMSAT - Satellite Detail - MCubed

CubeSats
Spacecraft launched in 2011
University of Michigan